The Huron River (in French: rivière Huron) is a tributary of the east bank of the rivière du Chêne which empties on the south shore of the St. Lawrence River. The Huron River flows through the municipalities of Laurier-Station, Notre-Dame-du-Sacré-Cœur-d'Issoudun, Saint-Édouard-de-Lotbinière, Saint-Janvier-de-Joly and Leclercville, in the Lotbinière Regional County Municipality, in the administrative region of Chaudière-Appalaches, in Quebec, in Canada.

Geography 

The main neighboring watersheds of the Huron River are:
 north side: Boucher arm, rivière du Bois Clair, Petit Saut river, Noire River, St. Lawrence River;
 east side: Bois Franc-Pierreriche stream, Bourret stream, Rouge River (Beaurivage River tributary), rivière aux Pins (Beaurivage River tributary), Beaurivage River;
 south side: Rivière aux Ormes (Huron River tributary), Rivière aux Cèdres, Rivière du Chêne;
 west side: rivière du Chêne.

The Huron River has its source at the confluence of the "Head of the Huron River" stream and a stream draining the northern part of the village of Laurier-Station.

  northwesterly, then northeasterly, crossing route 271, to the confluence of the Bois Franc-Pierriche stream;
  north-west, up to route 271;
  westward, up to the limit of Saint-Janvier-de-Joly;
  towards the south-west, marking the limit of Saint-Janvier-de-Joly and Notre-Dame-du-Sacré-Cœur-d'Issoudun, to the intermunicipal limit of Saint-Édouard-de-Lotbinière;
  towards the west, in Leclercville until its confluence.

The Huron River empties on the east bank of the rivière du Chêne in the Lucieville Range, in Leclercville.

Toponymy 
The toponym Rivière Huron was formalized on December 5, 1968, at the Commission de toponymie du Québec.

See also 

 List of rivers of Quebec

References 

Rivers of Chaudière-Appalaches
Lotbinière Regional County Municipality